Muhammad Ziyad bin Zolkefli  (born 15 March 1990) is a Paralympic athlete from Malaysia who competes in T20 classification shot put events. He is the current world record holder in his event. Zolkefli represented Malaysia at the 2012 Summer Paralympics in London, where he won the bronze medal in the shot put. As well as Paralympic success, Muhammad Ziyad has won both the World Championship and Asian Para Games titles in his sport, in 2013 and 2014 respectively.

Early life
Born in Selangor, Ziyad had an intellectual impairment which was identified in pre-school. He attended Sekolah Menengah Teknik Tanah Merah, Kelantan and was the eldest of four siblings. Before he joined the National Sports Council, Ziyad was selling kueh teow in Jalan Tunku Abdul Rahman.

Athletics career
In 2012, Ziyad came to prominence when he won the bronze medal – with a throw of 15.21m – in the men's F20 shot put event at the Paralympic Games in London.
He then created history when he registered a personal best of 15.23m to win the gold medal at his first International Paralympic Committee (IPC) World Athletics Championships in France. After his success at the 2013 World Championships, in which he won his country's only medal of the tournament, Ziyad was recognized as the National Paralympian Sportsman of the Year at the Anugerah Sukan Negara.

Rio De Janeiro Summer Paralympic 2016
At the 2016 Paralympic Games, he represented Malaysia again and won the gold medal in the shot put event and setting a new world record.

2017 World Para Athletics Championship
At the event held in the evening at the London Stadium, Queen Elizabeth Olympic Park, Muhammad Ziyad threw a distance of 17.29m to rewrite his own previous world record of 16.84m set at last year's Rio Paralympic Games in Brazil.

Tokyo Summer Paralympics 2020

At the 2020 Paralympic Games, he represented Malaysia again and contributed to Malaysia by winning the gold medal in the shot put event and setting a new world record twice, and broke the national record with a 17.94m throw during his 3rd throw at the final. However, he was later disqualified for not showing up on the court on time, and a Ukrainian official had also shown his dissent over the gold medal being initially awarded to Muhammad Ziyad. Ukraine's Maksym Koval was awarded the gold medal in the relevant discipline.

Honours

Honours of Malaysia 
  :
  Officer of the Order of the Defender of the Realm (K.M.N.) (2017)

See also
 List of IPC world records in athletics

References

External links
 Ziyad Zolkefli on Instagram
 Muhammad Ziyad Zolkefli - Tag Archive - Sports247.My

Living people
1990 births
People from Kuala Lumpur
Malaysian people of Malay descent
Paralympic athletes of Malaysia
Athletes (track and field) at the 2012 Summer Paralympics
Paralympic bronze medalists for Malaysia
Paralympic gold medalists for Malaysia
Malaysian male shot putters
Medalists at the 2012 Summer Paralympics
Medalists at the 2016 Summer Paralympics
World record holders in Paralympic athletics
Southeast Asian Games medalists in athletics
Southeast Asian Games bronze medalists for Malaysia
Officers of the Order of the Defender of the Realm
Competitors at the 2017 Southeast Asian Games
Competitors at the 2019 Southeast Asian Games
Southeast Asian Games silver medalists for Malaysia
Paralympic medalists in athletics (track and field)
Competitors in athletics with intellectual disability
Athletes (track and field) at the 2020 Summer Paralympics
Competitors stripped of Paralympic medals
Competitors at the 2021 Southeast Asian Games